Edi Sedyawati binti Iman Sudjahri (born 28 October 1938 in Malang; died 12 November 2022 in Jakarta) was an Indonesian archeologist and historian. She was a professor of archeology at the University of Indonesia, Chairperson of the university's Department of Javanese Letters and Center for Humanities and Social Sciences and also Chair of the Department of Dance at the Jakarta Institute for Arts. She also served as Indonesia's Director General of Culture in the Ministry of Education and Culture from 1993 to 1999.

Sedyawati studied various forms of Indonesian dance in Ikatan Seni Tari Indonesia, and in 1961 she performed in the Indonesian culture mission to China, North Korea, North Vietnam, and the USSR. Although the primary purpose of the culture mission was soft diplomacy to Indonesia's allies, in 2006 Sedyawati wrote in a reflection that the performers primarily benefitted by networking with Indonesians from diverse cultural backgrounds and learning about the various styles of dance and performance art in the archipelago.

In 1960, Sedyawati's work on dating carved statues near Karawang contributed toward proving that the ancient Tarumanagara kingdom embraced Hinduism.

References

1938 births
2022 deaths
Indonesian archaeologists
Indonesian female dancers
Indonesian women academics
Academic staff of the University of Indonesia
Indonesian women archaeologists
People from Malang